Play is the second EP by British rock band Ride. It was in the UK singles charts for 3 weeks in April 1990, peaking at #32.

The EP was combined with its predecessor Ride to form the Smile mini-album for the US market in July, 1990. In November, 1992, Smile was released in the UK.

In November 2022, all four songs from “Play” were made available on “4EPs”, a compilation album of Ride’s first four EPs made available together for the first time and packaged as one gatefold album on white vinyl and in CD format. It charted at number 78 on the UK Albums Chart.

Track listing

References

Ride (band) albums
1990 EPs
Creation Records EPs